Charles John Ferguson (usually known as C. J. Ferguson) (1840–1904) was an English architect who practised mainly in Carlisle, Cumbria. He was the younger son of Joseph Ferguson of Carlisle, and was articled to the architect John A. Cory. He spent some years in partnership with Cory, but most of his career was in single-handed practice. His output included new churches, restoration of existing churches, and work on country houses and public buildings. The architectural styles he used were mainly Gothic Revival and Norman.

Works designed in association with Cory are denoted by †.

Key

Works

References

Bibliography

 

 

Ferguson, C. J.